Lilianna Morawiec (born 11 February 1961) is a Polish speed skater. She competed in three events at the 1984 Winter Olympics.

References

External links
 

1961 births
Living people
People from Wałbrzych County
Sportspeople from Lower Silesian Voivodeship
Polish female speed skaters
Olympic speed skaters of Poland
Speed skaters at the 1984 Winter Olympics